This is a list of the songs that have been written by American songwriter Diane Warren. It is split into the full list of contributions and those that have performed in the charts across various countries. Additionally, the international singles and certifications are placed by order of the song's initial release, which may coincide with an album release.

Songs

Notes

References

 
Warren, Diane